Self-cultivation or personal cultivation is the development of one's mind or capacities through one's own efforts. Self-cultivation is the cultivation, integration and coordination of mind and body. Although self-cultivation may be practiced as a form of psychotherapy, it goes beyond healing and self-help to also encompass self-development and self-improvement. It is associated with attempts to go beyond normal states of being, and enhancing and endless polishing of a person's capacities and the development of innate human potential.

Self-cultivation also alludes to philosophical models in Confucianism, Taoism and other Chinese philosophies, as well as in Epicureanism, and is an essential component of well-established East-Asian ethical values. Although this term applies to cultural traditions in Confucianism and Taoism, the goals and aspirations of self-cultivation in these traditions differ greatly.

Theoretical background

Purposes and applications 
Self-cultivation is an essential component of the context of existential relations. It enhances individuality and personal growth and centralises the idea of human agency. Self-cultivation is a psychological process that cultivates one's mind and body which attempts to reach beyond the normal states of being. By enhancing their coordination and integration of thoughts and beliefs, it aims to polish a person's capacities and potentials endlessly.

Self-Cultivation: Cultural and Philosophical Psychotherapies 
During their history of evolution, Confucianism, Taoism, and Buddhism have adopted parts of doctrine from one another to form new branches and sects.  Some of them had been disseminated to neighbouring East Asian regions including Taiwan, Japan, and Korea.

Confucianism and the relational self 
Confucius believed that one's life is the continuation of their parents' life. Therefore, followers of Confucianism teach their children in such way that the younger generation is educated to cultivate themselves to live with a satisfactory level of self-discipline. Even though individuals see a clear-cut boundary between one's self and others, each person of a dyadic relationship is seen embedded in a particular social network. By respecting the parents, the elder and the superior, they are always raised to be morally upright to take others' expectation into consideration. From certain perspectives, it implies a form of social burden and stress from interpersonal relationships, and can cause disturbance and conflicts.

Taoism and the authentic self 

Whilst the Confucian way of self-cultivation might seem to be emotionally and spiritually restraining at times, Taoism tends to focus on linking the body and mind to the Nature. Taoism advocates the authentic self that is free from legal, social, or political restrictions. It seeks to cultivate one's self by healing and emancipating individuals from the ethical bounds of the human society. Taoism interprets the fortune or misfortune in one's life in terms of one's destiny, which is determined by the person's birth date and time. By avoiding the interference of personal desires and by relating everything to the system of the opposing elements of yin and yang, the cosmology of Taoism aims to keep individuals and everything in the harmonious balance. The explanation of self-cultivation in Taoism also corresponds to the equilibrium of the Five Transformative Phases ( Wu Xing): metal, wood, water, fire,  and  earth.

Buddhism and the non-self 

The ultimate life goal in Buddhism is nirvana. Individuals are encouraged to practice self-cultivation by detaching themselves from their desires and ego, and attain a mindful awareness of the non-self. Chán and Zen Buddhist scholars emphasise that the key in self-cultivation is a "beginner's mind" which can allow the uncovering of the "luminous mind" and the realisation of innate Buddha-nature through the experience of sudden enlightenment.

Influences of self-cultivation on Chinese Philosophy

Confucian self-cultivation as a psychological process 

Self-cultivation in the Confucian tradition refers to the action and effort of keeping the balance between inner and outer selves, and between self and others. Self-cultivation in Chinese is an abbreviation of "", which literally translates to "rectifying one’s mind and nurturing one’s character (with a particular art or philosophy)".

Confucianism embodies metaphysics of self. It develops a complex model of self-cultivation. The cohering key concept is 'intellectual intuition', which is explained as a direct cognition of knowledge, or an insight of reality, with no inference or logical reasoning. Confucianism combines both the outer and inner self in terms of spiritual cultivation, which is world redemption and vindication, as well as self-cultivation.

Self-cultivation is a traditional Chinese philosophical concept that forms a fundamental level of understanding of Confucianism. This philosophy aims to achieve a harmonious society and it is dependent on personal moral cultivation. The process entails the pursuit of moral perfection and knowledge.

Junzi

In the Analects that Confucius is depicted to transmit instead of innovate, there are two types of persons. One is the "profound person", and the other is "petty person". These two types are opposed to one another in terms of developed potential. Individuals are not defined in terms of basic potential, as Confucius summarises in the Analects, that "all human beings are alike at birth" (17.2) and "the profound person understands what is moral. The petty person understands what is profitable" (4.16).

The grass shall bend when the wind is let to blow over it."|Analects, 12.32}}

The following passages from the Analects points out the pathway Confucius taught towards self-cultivation, with the ultimate goal of becoming the :

In the first passage, "self-reflection" is explained as "Do not do to other what you do not desire for yourself" (15.24). Confucius considers it extremely important for one to realise the necessity of concern and empathy for others, which can be achieved by reflecting upon oneself. The deeply relational self can then respond to inner reflection with outer virtue.

The second passage indicates the life-long time scale of the process of self-cultivation. It can begin during one's early teenage years, then extends well into more-mature age. The process includes the transformation of the individual, where they realise that they should be able to distinguish and choose from what is right and what is desired.

Self-cultivation, as Confucius expects, is an essential philosophical process for one to become  by maximising . He aims to reflect upon a self that is able to compare itself with moral and social principles of tradition. Confucius, as a scholar who represents early Chinese philosophy and school of thought, does not suffer from the Cartesian "mind-body problem" as H. Fingarette has demonstrated. In Confucianism, there is no division between inner and outer self, thus the cumulative effect brought by Confucian self-cultivation is not just limited to one's self or personal, but rather social and even cosmic. 

 Cultural and Ethical Values involved 

As one of the key principles of Confucianism, self-cultivation may be considered the core of Chinese philosophy. The latter can be seen as the disciplined reflections on the insights of self-cultivation. While E. Balazs asserted that all Chinese philosophy is social philosophy and that the idea of the group takes precedence over conceptions of the individual self as the social dimension of the human condition features so prominently in the Chinese world of thought, Wing-tsit Chan suggests a more comprehensive characterisation of Chinese philosophy as humanism: 'not the humanism that denies or slights a Supreme Power, but one that professes the unity of man and Heaven

Similar to the Western sense of guilt, the Chinese sense of shame is studied to amplify that social approval and other external factors, such as the impression from others, defines the fundamental morals the Chinese society holds, rather than internal psychological sanction. In Chinese ethics, the prevalent sociological literature on the mechanisms of "saving face" and "networking" exhibits the importance of Chinese interpersonal and social relationships via the understanding of self-cultivation.

 Cultivation of self in East Asian philosophy of education 
In the East Asian cultures, self-cultivation has always been one of the most important concerns in regards to personal growth. Therefore, in order to help students and the younger generation understand the true meaning of being a person, philosophers (mostly considered scholars) tried to explain their own definition of self with various theoretical approaches.

The legacy of Chinese philosopher Confucius, and many others (for example, Laozi, Zhuangzi and Mencius) from thousands of years ago, has provided a rich and unique domain of Chinese-philosophical cultural heritage in East Asia. Firstly, the ultimate goal of education, and essentially, one's most noble goal in life, is to properly develop oneself in order to become a "profound person". The youth was taught that it was shameful to become a "petty person", as that was the exact opposite to "sage". However, as both Confucian and Daoist philosophers adopted the term , there has been possible divergence that lead to differences in educational concepts and practices. Besides Confucianism and Daoism existing as the ideas accepted and understood by the majority, the Hundred Schools of Thought in Ancient China also had Buddhist and various other branches of philosophy, offering different thoughts on the ideal conception of self.

In modern era, some East Asian cultures have abandoned some of the archaic conceptions, or have replaced the traditional humanistic education with more-common modern approach of self-cultivation that adapts the influences of globalisation. Nevertheless, the East Asian descendants and followers of Confucius still consider an ideal human being essential for their life-time education, with their cultural heritage deeply influenced by radical Confucian values.

 Modern practices 

 The "self"-concept in Western culture 
The "self" concept in western psychology originated from views of a number of empiricists and rationalists. By its very nature, the concept of "self" has continued to exhibit high involvement in Western educational psychology. Hegel (1770–1831) established a more comprehensive belief of self-consciousness. That is, by observation, our subject-object consciousness stimulates our rationale and reasoning, which then guides human behaviour. The 3-part model of the psyche Freud (1856–1939) developed comprises the Id (Das Es), the Ego (Das Ich), and the superego (Das Über-Ich; Freud, 1923). Freud's self-concept has established an influence on Erikson (1902–1994), who emphasized self-identity crisis and self-development. Following Erikson, J. Marcia described the continuum of identity development and the nature of our self-identity.

The more commonly-recognised concept, self-consciousness, is derived from self-esteem, self-regulation, and self-efficacy. The subject's concept of "self" is defined in how the individual perceives and builds the link between their self and the world around them.

 Morita therapy 

Through case-based research, Japanese psychologist Morita Masatake (1874–1938) introduced Morita therapy. Morita Therapy is developed based on Masatake's theory of consciousness. With assistance from his four-stage therapeutic method, Morita Therapy is described as an ecological therapy method that focuses on purpose through individuals' responses. Morita therapy is cognate with rational-emotive therapy by American psychologist A. Ellis. Commonalities have also been established between Morita Therapy and existential and cognitive behavioral therapy.

 Naikan therapy Naikan ("", self-reflection) is a Japanese psychotherapeutic method introduced and developed decades ago by Japanese businessman and Buddhist monk (Jōdo Shinshū) Yoshimoto Ishin (1916–1988).

Initially, naikan therapy was more often used in correctional settings, however its recent adaption has been switched to situational and psychoneurotic disorders.

In comparison to Morita therapy, naikan therapy requires shorter period of time and is able to regulate longer periods of meditation on the daily basis, where the focus of introspection is moved to the resolution of conflicts.

Similar to Morita therapy, naikan requires a relatively total subordination to a carefully structured period of "retreat," that is compassionately supervised by the practitioner. Contrary to Morita, naikan is shorter (seven days) and utilizes long, regulated periods of daily meditation where introspection is directed toward the resolution of contemporary conflicts and problems.

"In contrast to Western psychoanalytic psychotherapy, both naikan and Morita tend to keep transference issues simplified and positive, while resistance is dealt with procedurally rather than interpretively."

 The theory of constructive living 
Based largely on the adaptions of two Japanese structured methods of self-reflection, Naikan therapy and Morita therapy, constructive living is a Western approach to mental health education. Purpose-centered and response-oriented, constructive living (sometimes abbreviated as CL) focuses on the mindfulness and purposes of one's life. It is considered as a process of action to approach the reality thoughtfully. It also emphasizes the ability to understand one's self by recognizing the past, in which it reflects upon the present. Constructive Living highlights the importance of acceptance, of the world we live in, as well as the emotions and feelings individuals have in unique situations.

D. Reynolds, Author of Constructive Living'' and Director of the Constructive Living Center in Oregon, U.S.A, argues that before taking the actions which may potentially bring positive changes, people are often hold back by the belief of "dealing with negative emotions first". According to Reynolds, the most crucial component of the process of effectuating affirmations is not getting the mind right. However, one's mind and emotions are effectively adjusted during the process of self-reflection, which indicates that there shall be a behavioural change taken place beforehand.

Epicurean meleta 
At the closing of his Letter to Menoeceus, Epicurus instructs his disciple to practice (meleta) "both by yourself and with others of like mind". The first field of practice shares semantic roots with and is related to the Hellenistic philosophical concept of "epimeleia heauton" (self-care), which involves methods of self-cultivation. In addition to the study of philosophy, this may include other techniques for living (techne biou) or technologies of the soul, like the visualizing technique known as "placing before the eyes", a cognitive therapy technique known as "relabeling", moral portraiture, and other didactic and ethical methods. We find examples of these techniques in Philodemus of Gadara, the poet Lucretius, and other Epicurean guides.

Nietzsche's ethics of self-cultivation 

"If you incorporate this thought within you, amongst your other thoughts" he maintains "It will transform you. If for everything you wish to do you begin by asking yourself: 'Am I certain I want to do this an infinite number of times?' this will become for you the greatest weight." (KSA 9:11 [143])
Nietzsche worked on the project of reviving Self-cultivation, an ancient ethics. "I hate everything that merely instructs me without augmenting or directly invigorating my own activity"(HL 2:1) "It follows therefore that he must conceive eternal recurrence among other things as a practice that stimulates self-cultivation. In fact in one of his characteristically grandiose moments he identified it as 'the great cultivating thought' in the sense that it might weed out those too weak to bear the thought of living again (WP 1053). In a more tempered fashion, however, he framed the thought of recurrence as part of an ethics of self-cultivation and self-transformation."

See also 
Self
 Neo-Confucianism
 Eastern philosophy

References

Bibliography

Confucian Self-Cultivation and Daoist Personhood, H.Wang

Gramsci, A. (1992). Prison notebooks, Vol. 2. New York, NY: Columbia University Press. [Google Scholar]
Heidegger, M. (1969). Identity and difference (J. Stambaugh, Trans. with an introduction.). New York, NY: Harper & Row Publishers. [Google Scholar]
Heidegger, M. (1977). The question concerning technology and other essays ( W. Lovitt, Trans. with an introduction.). New York: Harper Torchbooks. [Google Scholar]
Heidegger, M. (1978). Letter on humanism. In D. F. Krell (Ed.), Basic writings (2nd ed., pp. 213–265). London: Routledge. [Google Scholar]
Huang, C. -C. (2010). Humanism in East Asian Confucian Contexts. Bielefeld: Transcript Verlag.[Crossref], [Google Scholar]
Legge, J. (Trans.). (1861). Confucian analects. The Chinese classics, volume 1. (D. Sturgeon, Ed.). Chinese Text Project. Retrieved 21 March 2017, from http://ctext.org/analects [Google Scholar]
Wittgenstein, L. (1997). Philosophical investigations (2nd ed.). (G. E. M. Anscombe, Trans.). Malden, MA: Blackwell. [Google Scholar]
Wittgenstein, L. (2001). Tractatus Logico-philosophicus (D. F. Pears & B. F. McGuinness, Trans.). New York, NY: Routledge.  [Google Scholar]
Yu, K. P. (2013). The hows and whys of the classics of filial piety孝經的道與理 (Xiaojing de dao yu li). Hong Kong: InfoLink. [Google Scholar]

External links

 
 
 Stanford Encyclopedia of Philosophy Entry: Confucius
 Interfaith Online: Confucianism
 Confucian Documents at the Internet Sacred Texts Archive.
 Oriental Philosophy, "Topic:Confucianism"

Institutional
 China Confucian Philosophy
 China Confucian Religion
 China Confucian Temples
 China Kongzi Network

Chinese philosophy
Concepts in ethics
Confucian ethics
Taoist philosophy
Taoist practices
Buddhist practices
Buddhist philosophy
Psychotherapy
Self-care
Personal development
Philosophy of life